Beatrice Augusta de Leon born Beatrice Augusta Lewisohn (12 August 1902 – 16 February 1991) was a British theatre manager, dance school owner and impresario. She and Jack de Leon founded the Q Theatre funded by Delia de Leon.

Life
Leon was born in London Borough of Hackney in 1902. Her parents were Lydia Moses and Bernhard Lewisohn. Her father was a boot manufacturer who died in 1906. She was taken to the theatre and the opera when she was growing up and her mother would get her to recite.
She first learnt shorthand and to type before she followed her elder brother Victor into the acting profession training at Herbert Beerbohm Tree's Academy of Dramatic Art. She later did some acting but discovered that she had stage fright.

In 1923 she and Delia de Leon founded the London Academy of Dramatic Art. She had married Delia's brother in 1921 Jack de Leon. He was a solicitor with an interest in the arts.

In 1924 she and her husband took a lease of what had been the Prince's Hall Cinema. It was no longer a cinema but had become a film studio for a while. It the past it had been a pub and roller disco and it was owned by a brewery. They decided to call their theatre in Kew the Q Theatre. The first production was "The Young Person in Pink" on Boxing Day. The idea was to feature new plays at their new theatre but the first choice was a successful comedy by Gertrude Jennings. de Leon made her professional debut as an actor in this play. Plays continued at the Q Theatre until 1929 when disagreements led to the de Leon's stepping back. Her husband was having success as a playwright and was involved with other West End productions. His first play was performed at the Q Theatre as was the first play by Terence Rattigan and William Douglas-Home.

Beatie returned in 1931 to put on productions created by her drama school. Beatie was now in charge and the theatre returned to professional productions with several transferring to the West End.

Jack died in 1956 and the Q Theatre closed. She and her daughter Jean ran a dance studios at the Richmond Adult College for thirty years. After she retired, Beatie would use her money to back new productions in the West End. One of her successes was to invest in Oliver!.

Leon lived with her sister in law Delia in Kew. She died at her home in 1956. The building that contained the Q theatre was demolished and replaced with a block of flats.

References

1902 births
1991 deaths
People from Hackney, London
Theatre managers and producers